Sucker And Dry was the second 7" to be released by the American indie rock band Cursive.  It was released in 1997.  The only format it was available in was 7".

Both of the songs were later put on the compilation, The Difference Between Houses and Homes in 2005.

Track listing
 "Sucker And Dry" – 3:01
 "And The Bit Just Chokes Them" – 4:50

Personnel
 Tim Kasher – vocals, guitar
 Steve Pedersen – guitar
 Matt Maginn – bass
 Clint Schnase – drums

References

Cursive (band) songs
1997 EPs